Paul Ludvig Laurits Berth (7 April 1890 in Copenhagen – 9 November 1969 in Gentofte) was a Danish amateur Association football player, who played 26 games and scored one goal for the Denmark national team, with whom he won a silver medal at the 1912 Summer Olympics.

Berth played for Danish team Akademisk Boldklub (AB), when he made his Danish national team debut in October 1911. He was part of the Danish team at the 1912 Summer Olympics, in which he played all three matches as Denmark won the silver medals in the football tournament. With AB, he won the 1919 and 1921 Danish football championships. He was a part of the Danish squad at the 1920 Summer Olympics, but spent the tournament as an unused reserve. He ended his national team career in April 1922, having played 26 international games for Denmark, 14 of these as team captain.

References

External links
Danish national team profile
DatabaseOlympics profile

1890 births
1969 deaths
Danish men's footballers
Denmark international footballers
Footballers at the 1912 Summer Olympics
Footballers at the 1920 Summer Olympics
Olympic footballers of Denmark
Olympic silver medalists for Denmark
Olympic medalists in football
Medalists at the 1912 Summer Olympics
Association football midfielders
Footballers from Copenhagen